The Liga TDP  is Mexico's fourth tier in the Mexican League System. The Liga TDP  is divided into 17 groups. For the 2009/2010 season, the format of the tournament has been reorganized to a home and away format, which all teams will play in their respective group. The 17 groups consist of teams which are eligible to play in the liguilla de ascenso for three promotion spots, teams which are affiliated with teams in the Liga MX, Liga de Expansión MX and Liga Premier, which are not eligible for promotion but will play that who the better filial team in a sixteen team filial playoff tournament for the entire season.

Teams
Participating clubs for the 2022–23 tournament:

* Teams with an affiliate in the Liga MX and that are not eligible for promotion.

** Teams with an affiliate in the Liga de Expansión MX and that are not eligible for promotion.

*** Teams with an affiliate in the Liga Premier and that are not eligible for promotion.

Group I
(2022-2023) There are 13 teams in Group 1 (G1).

Campeche
Cantera Venados **
Chetumal
Corsarios de Campeche
Deportiva Venados ***
Felinos 48
Inter Playa del Carmen ***

Mayas
Mons Calpe
Pampaneros de Champotón
Pioneros Junior **
Progreso **
Saraguatos de Palenque

Group II
(2022-2023) There are 11 teams in Group 2 (G2) 

Antequera
Atlético Ixtepec
Búhos de Oaxaca
CEFOR Chiapas
Cruz Azul Lagunas *
Dragones de Oaxaca

Garra Fraylesca (franchise loan from Toros Huatusco)
Lechuzas UPGCH
Milenarios de Oaxaca
Profutsoccer
Universidad del Sureste

Group III
(2022-2023) There are 13 teams in Group 3 (G3)

Académicos UGM
Atlante Xalapa **
Caballeros de Córdoba
Conejos de Tuxtepec
Córdoba (franchise registered as Deportivo Albiazul)
Delfines UGM
Diablos Blancos (franchise loan from Unión Magdalena Contreras)

Guerreros de Puebla
Licántropos
Lobos Puebla
Los Ángeles
Reales de Puebla
Tehuacán

Group IV
(2022-2023) There are 16 teams in Group 4 (G4).

Álamos
América Coyoacán * (franchise loan from Valle de Xico)
Aragón
Atlético Mexicano
Aztecas AMF Soccer
Cefor Mario Gálvez (franchise loan from Marina)
Chilangos
Coyotes (franchises loan from Escorpiones)

Cuervos Blancos
Domínguez Osos
Halcones de Rayón
Lobos UTD Ehécatl (franchise loan from Promodep Central)
Muxes
Novillos Neza
Oceanía
Politécnico

Group V
(2022-2023) There are 16 teams in Group 5 (G5).

Academia América Leyendas (franchise loan from San José del Arenal)
Academia Mineros CDMX (franchise loan from CH)
Cañoneros ***
CARSAF (franchise loan from Azucareros de Tezonapa)
Cefor Cuauhtémoc Blanco
CDM
Cordobés
Dongu ***

Ecatepec
Guerreros DD
Héroes de Zaci
Independiente Mexiquense
Morelos
Olimpo
Sangre de Campeón
Unión

Group VI
(2022-2023) There are 16 teams in Group 6 (G6)

Águilas de Teotihuacán
Alebrijes Teotihuacán **
Artesanos Metepec
Atlante Chalco **
Ciervos ***
Estudiantes
Eurosoccer (franchise loan from Metepec)
FORMAFUTINTEGRAL

Leones Huixquilucan
Orishas Tepeji
Panteras Neza (franchise loan from Castores Gobrantacto)
Proyecto México Soccer (franchise loan from Grupo Sherwood)
Real San Luis (franchise loan from Originales Aguacateros)
Tenancingo (franchise loan from Fuerza Mazahua)
Toluca *
Zitácuaro ***

Group VII
(2022-2023) There are 14 teams in Group 7 (G7)

Academia Cuextlán
Arroceros Jojutla (franchise registered as Académicos Jojutla)
Águilas UAGro
Atlético Real del Puente (franchise loan from Santiago Tulantepec)
Caudillos Zapata (franchise loan from Caudillos de Morelos)
CILESI
Iguala

Iguanas
Juárez *
Oaxtepec (franchise loan from Pejelagartos de Tabasco)
Selva Cañera
Tlapa
Tigres Yautepec (franchise loan from Atlético Cuernavaca)
Yautepec

Group VIII
(2022-2023) There are 16 teams in Group 8 (G8).

Atlético Pachuca
Atlético Toltecas (franchise loan from Texcoco)
Atlético Tulancingo
Bombarderos de Tecámac
Cefor Chaco Giménez
Faraones de Texcoco
Guerreros de La Plata
Halcones Negros

Halcones Zúñiga
Hidalguense
Matamoros
Pachuca *
Sk Sport
Tulancingo ***
Tuzos Pachuca *
Unión Astros (franchise loan from Histeria)

Group IX
(2022-2023) There are 10 teams in Group 9 (G9)

Atlético Huauchinango (franchise loan from Atlético Boca del Río)
Atlético Huejutla
Garzas Blancas (franchise loan from Bucaneros de Matamoros)
Orgullo Surtam
Papanes de Papantla

Poza Rica
Sultanes de Tamazunchale
Tantoyuca
Tuxpan
Venados de Misantla

Group X
(2022-2023) There are 13 teams in Group 10 (G10)

Celaya **
Celaya Linces
Correcaminos Tequisquiapan ** (franchise loan from Cañada CTM)
La Piedad Querétaro
Estudiantes de Querétaro
Inter de Querétaro ***
Fundadores El Marqués

Inter San Pablo (franchise loan from Querétaro 3D) ***
Lobos ITECA
Mineros Querétaro **
San Juan del Río
San Miguel Internacional
Titanes de Querétaro

Group XI
(2022-2023) There are 9 teams in Group 11 (G11)

Aguacateros de Peribán
Atlético Chavinda
Atlético Valladolid
Delfines de Abasolo
Furia Azul

H2O Purépechas **
Huetamo (franchise loan from Degollado) ***
Michoacán
Salamanca (franchise loan from Jaral del Progreso)

Group XII
(2022-2023) There are 12 teams in Group 12 (G12).

Atlético ECCA
Atlético Leonés
Cachorros de León (franchise loan from Fut–Car)
Calor León ***
Empresarios del Rincón (franchise loan from Real Olmeca Sport)
León GEN *

Necaxa *
Mineros de Zacatecas **
Pabellón
Suré
Tuzos UAZ ***
Zorros San Luis (franchise loan from Zacatecas)

Group XIII
(2022-2023) There are 12 teams in Group 13 (G13)

Acatlán
Agaveros
Alteños Acatic **
Aves Blancas
Ayense
Gorilas de Juanacatlán

Nacional
Oro
UD Salamanca
Tapatíos Soccer
Tepatitlán **
Tornados Tlaquepaque (franchise loan from Atlético Cocula)

Group XIV
(2022–2023) There are 12 teams in Group 14 (G14)

AFAR Manzanillo
Caja Oblatos
Catedráticos Elite ***
Charales de Chapala
Cimagol
Diablos Tesistán

Gallos Viejos
Halcones de Zapopan ***
Leones Negros UdeG **
Pro Training Camp
Real Ánimas de Sayula
Tecos ***

Group XV
(2022–2023). There are 12 teams in Group 15 (G15).

Alfareros de Tonalá
Atlético Acaponeta
Atlético Nayarit
Coras ***
Dorados de Sinaloa **
Fénix CFAR

FuraMochis
Legado del Centenario
Puerto Vallarta
Deportivo Tala (franchise loan from Volcanes de Colima)
Tigres de Alica
Xalisco

Group XVI
(2021–2022). There are 14 teams in Group 16 (G16).

Cadereyta
Correcaminos UAT **
Gallos Nuevo León *
Gavilanes de Matamoros (franchise registered as HO GAR H. Matamoros) ***
Guerreros Reynosa
Halcones de Saltillo (franchise loan from San Isidro Laguna)
Irritilas

Mineros Reynosa (franchise loan from Deportivo Soria)
Real San Cosme
Saltillo Soccer ***
San Nicolás
San Pedro 7-10
Santiago
Tigres SD *

Group XVII
(2022–2023). There are 11 teams in Group 17 (G17).

Búhos UNISON
Cachanillas
CEPROFFA
Chihuahua ***
Cobras Fútbol Premier
Cimarrones de Sonora **

Etchojoa
Guaymas
La Tribu de Ciudad Juárez
Obson Dynamo
Xoloitzcuintles de Caliente *

Group XVIII
(2022–2023). There are 5 teams in Group 18 (G18).

40 Grados MXL
Gladiadores
London

Rosarito
Tecate

Current format
Tercera División currently features 225 teams divided into 18 groups. There are 38 teams with filials (affiliates) in the Liga MX (First Division), Liga de Expansión MX or Liga Premier, which are not eligible for promotion. The Tercera follows the usual double round-robin format in which each club plays every other club twice within their own group.

The teams will be divided in accordance to their geographical zone. The teams in each subgroup of 18 will then play each other in the double round-robin format within their own subgroup. Teams receive three points for a win, one point for a draw, and no points for a loss. If a game ends in a draw both team are awarded one point for the draw in regulation time and will then move on to the execution of penalties. The team who wins in the penalty series will be awarded a point in addition to the point won for drawing during regulation time. Teams are ranked by total points won.

Qualification for promotion
Three teams from the Tercera Division will be promoted to Second Division de Mexico, Campeon de Campeones (National Champion), Subcampéon de Campeones (National runner-up) and Subcampeón de Ascenso (Winner of the match between regional runners-up). The national champion and national runner-up will be promoted to the Liga Premier Serie A, depending on their economic development and infrastructure, the team could be placed in Serie B in case of failure to comply with the participation requirements of Serie A. The regional runners-up will play in Serie B.

Of the teams that are eligible for promotion, 64 teams will qualify for play-offs to determine which team will be promoted. The Round of 32, Round of 16, Quarter-finals, Semi-finals and the finals will be played in a home and away format, the winner being determined by the aggregate score. Also, Participating in the play-offs is the 16 affiliate clubs without the right to be promoted to the Liga MX, Liga de Expansión MX and Liga Premier.

Round of 32
The 64 teams classified to the promotion stage will be divided into two zones of 32 clubs according to their geographical location. Zone A will integrate the teams from groups 1 to 7 of the regular season and Zone B will group the clubs belonging to groups 8 to 17. The teams will be seeded based on their final overall record in regular season play.

{|width=100%
|valign="top"|
Ascenso
1 vs. 32
2 vs. 31
3 vs. 30
4 vs. 29
5 vs. 28
6 vs. 27
7 vs. 26
8 vs. 25
9 vs. 24
10 vs. 23
11 vs. 22
12 vs. 21
13 vs. 20
14 vs. 19
15 vs. 18
16 vs. 17

Round of 16
In this round, the remaining teams will play in a representing zone that they are in. The teams will be reseeded after Round of 32 based on their final overall record in regular season play.

Quarterfinals
For this phase, the remaining teams in their represent zone plays each other. The teams will be reseeded after Round of 16 based on their final overall record in regular season play.

Semi-finals
For this phase, the remaining teams in their represent zone plays each other. The teams will be reseeded after Quarterfinals based on their final overall record in regular season play.

Zone Final
For this phase, the remaining teams in their represent zone plays each other. The teams will be reseeded after Semifinals based on their final overall record in regular season play. Both finalists from each zone will be promoted to Liga Premier Serie A (Segunda Division).

Promotion runner–up
For this phase, the two losing teams of the zone finals participate to determine the winner of a promotion to Serie B. The teams will be reseeded after Semifinals based on their final overall record in regular season play. The winner will be promoted to Liga Premier Serie B (Segunda Division).

Final or Campeón de Campeones
The final will be disputed between the highest seed of playoffs and lowest seed of playoffs based on their final overall record in regular season play.

Promotion
The team that wins in the aggregate score will be crowned champion and will be promoted to the Liga Premier. This team will be placed on Serie A or Serie B according to the social, sporting, financial and legal requirements of the Second Division. The runner-up will be promoted to the Serie A or Serie B and the third and fourth place will be promoted to Serie B.

Certification requirements
For Tercera Division Profesional Certificate be considered, you must meet the social, sporting, financial and legal requirements; Clubs who win promotion and get the support settlement letter from the Division to participate in the Segunda Division de Mexico complying with the following:
Having full legal rule and membership record with the corporate documents, legal and financial sport under the Rules of Affiliation, name and headquarters.
Facilities must comply with the guidelines by the Rules of Membership, Name and Ground of Segunda Division de Mexico.
Having no debt in the Statement of the Division or at the FMF.

Champions

References

External links
Tercera División de México Official Website 

4
Professional sports leagues in Mexico